Harare Sports Club Ground is a cricket ground in Harare, the capital city of Zimbabwe. It has been used for cricket matches since 1910 and has hosted international matches as well as domestic games. The venue is the Zimbabwe national cricket team's most frequently used home ground. The first Test match at the venue was held in October 1992 with India as the visiting side. The two sides met in the ground's first One Day International (ODI) later the same month and played the first Twenty20 International (T20I) on the ground in 2010. The ground hosted One Day International matches during the 2003 ICC Cricket World Cup and 2018 ICC World Cup Qualifier and hosted the final of the 2019 ICC Women's World Cup Africa Region Qualifier competition, the only Women's international match to be played on the ground.

In cricket, a five-wicket haul (also known as a "five-for" or "fifer") refers to a bowler taking five or more wickets in a single innings. This is regarded as a notable achievement. This article details the five-wicket hauls taken on the ground in official international Test and One Day International matches.

The first bowler to take a five-wicket haul in a Test match on the ground was Zimbabwean John Traicos who took five wickets for 86 runs against India in the first international match at the venue. The best figures in Test cricket on the ground are the 8/63 taken by Sri Lankan spinner Rangana Herath against Zimbabwe in 2016. In the same match Herath took the best match figures in Test cricket on the ground, taking 13 wickets, including five-wicket hauls in both innings.

The first ODI five-wicket haul on the ground was taken by Eddo Brandes who took 5/28, including a hat-trick, in 1997 against England. The best ODI bowling figures on the ground are West Indian fast bowler Fidel Edwards' 6/22 taken in 2003. , no five-wicket hauls have been taken in Twenty20 International matches on the ground.

Key

Test match five-wicket hauls

A total of 35 five-wicket hauls have been taken in Test matches on the ground.

One Day International five-wicket hauls
In total, 18 five-wicket hauls have been recorded in ODIs on the ground.

See also
List of international cricket centuries at the Harare Sports Club

Notes

References

External links
International five-wicket hauls at Harare Sports Club, CricInfo

Harare Sports Club
Zimbabwean cricket lists